Elections were held in the state of Western Australia on 8 February 1986 to elect all 57 members to the Legislative Assembly and 17 members to the 34-seat Legislative Council. The Labor government, led by Premier Brian Burke, won a second term in office against the Liberal Party, led by Opposition Leader Bill Hassell since 16 February 1984.

The election resulted in one of Labor's best state election results after World War II, and featured a united National Party for the first time since the 1977 election.

Results

Legislative Assembly

|}

Notes:
 The National Country Party (NCP) and the National Party (NP), which had been two separate parties from 1978 onwards, united in 1985 to form the National Party. Three sitting members who had previously identified as National Country Party stood for the Liberal Party in 1986, with two losing their seats to the Nationals, and the other (Bert Crane in Moore) retaining his seat. The Nationals also gained Avon from the Labor Party, and Mount Marshall from the Liberals, who had held it for a single term.

Legislative Council

|}

Seats changing parties

 Members listed in italics did not contest their seat at this election.
 * figure is vs. Liberal
 ** figure is vs. Labor
 *** figure is vs. National (pre-merger)

Post-election pendulum

Opinion polling

See also
 Candidates of the 1986 Western Australian state election
 Members of the Western Australian Legislative Assembly, 1983–1986
 Members of the Western Australian Legislative Assembly, 1986–1989

References

Elections in Western Australia
1986 elections in Australia
1980s in Western Australia
February 1986 events in Australia